George Allsopp may refer to:

 George Allsopp (Canadian merchant) (c.1733–1805), British-born fur trader in Canada
 George Waters Allsopp (1769–1837), seigneur, businessman and political figure in Lower Canada
 George Allsopp (British politician) (1846–1907), English brewer and Conservative Party politician